Calamoschoena stictalis is a moth in the family Crambidae. It was described by George Hampson in 1919. It is found in Malawi, Mozambique, South Africa and Zimbabwe.

References

Moths described in 1919
Schoenobiinae
Moths of Sub-Saharan Africa
Lepidoptera of Malawi
Lepidoptera of Mozambique
Lepidoptera of South Africa
Lepidoptera of Zimbabwe